San Pedro Alcántara  (St. Peter of Alcántara) (pop: approx 35,500) lies on the main Costa del Sol coastal road the N340/A7 as well as the toll motorway the AP7, 10 km west of Marbella in Andalucia, Southern Spain.
It is easily accessed from either Málaga or Cádiz and via the C339 from Sevilla and Ronda. The nearest airports of Málaga and Gibraltar are both within an hour's drive.
It is situated in the fertile plain of the same name, Vega de San Pedro Alcántara, a broad stretch of coastal lowland surrounded in a semicircle by rugged hills. On the East the Sierra Blanca of Marbella, dominated by its highest peak Pico del Astonar (1.270 m.) better known locally as "La Concha" (The Shell) because of its resemblance to a fluted sea shell when viewed from the west. To the North, there is the Sierra del Real or El Real del Duque, the Sierra de las Nieves and those of Tolox, on the West of the town the Monte Mayor and, finally, closing the mountain line the Sierra Bermeja.

History
The town was founded by the first marquis of the Duero, Manuel Gutiérrez de la Concha e Irigoyen in 1860 as a rural colony. San Pedro Alcántara owes in fact its name to the marquis, who named it after his mother Petra de Alcántara Irigoyen y de la Quintana and a saint, San Pedro de Alcántara. The project was ambitious: thanks to multiple little dykes and new agricultural equipment imported from the States, a vast, once-dry area was restored. The fields requested skilled and experienced farmers, and due to the good living conditions offered to the workers, many converged to the colony from the cities of Granada, Almería, Valencia and Murcia.

Leisure

San Pedro has the last summer fair (feria) in Andalucia which takes place during the week of 18 October,
and lasts four days.

External links
 Book Fair San Pedro de Alcántara.
 San Pedro Alcantara City Guide & Tourism Information.
Population of the municipality of Marbella, which includes San Pedro Alcántara.

Municipalities in the Province of Málaga
Towns in Spain